The Costa Rica national beach soccer team represents Costa Rica in international beach soccer competitions and is controlled by the Costa Rican Football Federation, the governing body for football in Costa Rica.

Competitive record

Current squad

Achievements
 FIFA Beach Soccer World Cup Best: Fifteenth Place
 2009
 CONCACAF Beach Soccer Championship Best: Runners-up
 2009
 2015

External links
 Squad

North American national beach soccer teams
Beach Soccer